Abdallah ibn Mu'allim Yusuf al-Qutbi (c. 1879 – 1952) was a Somali polemicist, theologian and philosopher who lived in Qulunqul (Kolonkol), Somalia.

Biography
Sheikh Al-Qutbi is best known for his Al-Majmu'at al-mubaraka ("The Blessed Collection"), a five-part compilation of polemics that was published in Cairo ca. 1919–1920 (1338).
Sheikh Abdullahi Qutbi, a disciple of Sheikh Abdulrahman Al Shashi and member of Qadiriyyah congregation, an Islamic school of thought or tariqah.

See also
Shaykh Sufi

References

1879 births
1952 deaths
Somalian religious leaders
Somalian Sunni Muslim scholars of Islam